Divorce is a 1945 drama film about a much-divorced woman who sets her sights on her married childhood friend. It stars Kay Francis, Bruce Cabot, and Helen Mack.

Plot summary

A woman who has been married and divorced five times comes back to her small hometown, where she proceeds to complicate, and potentially destroy, the marriage of her childhood boyfriend.

Cast
 Kay Francis as Diane Carter
 Bruce Cabot as Bob Phillips
 Helen Mack as Martha Phillips
 Jerome Cowan as Jim Driscoll
 Craig Reynolds as Bill Endicott
 Ruth Lee as Liz Smith
 Jean Fenwick as June Endicott
 Mary Gordon as Ellen
 Larry Olsen as Michael Phillips
 Johnny Calkins as Robby Phillips
 Jonathan Hale as Judge Conlon
 Addison Richards as Plummer
 Leonard Mudie as Harvey Hicks
 Reid Kilpatrick as Dr. Andy Cole
 Virginia Wave as Secretary

References

Reception

One New York State paper found it a “motion picture of unusual excellence, judged from any standpoint,” and continued: “Miss Francis, as the much-married divorcee of the story, is a poised, ruthless woman of the world and displays all the seductive artistry which long ago established her as a star of the first rank. Bruce Cabot is equally fine as a happily married man, a returned officer of the present war, who succumbs to the wiles of the predatory Miss Francis, and leaves his family for her. Helen Mack is outstanding as the deserted wife who fights for her rights, and others in the cast who do especially good work are Jerome Cowan, Craig Reynolds, Ruth Lee, Jean Fenwick, Mary Gordon, Jonathan Hale and Addison Richards, as well as two precocious child actors, Larry Olsen and Johnny Calkins.”

External links
 
 
 
 

1945 films
American black-and-white films
1945 romantic drama films
Monogram Pictures films
American romantic drama films
Films about divorce
1940s English-language films
Films directed by William Nigh
1940s American films